Batar is a rocket launcher.

Batar may also refer to:
Batar, New South Wales, a locality in Australia
Batar (river), a river in Ukraine and Hungary
Batăr, a commune in Bihor County, Romania
Batar, Pakistan, settlement in Pakistan
Batar (Bijeljina), settlement in Bosnia and Herzegovina
Batar (IDF) (Bsis Tironut), Israeli Defense Forces recruit-training base

See also
 Betar (disambiguation)